Celidosphenella benoisti is a species of tephritid or fruit flies in the genus Celidosphenella of the family Tephritidae.

Distribution
Ecuador.

References

Tephritinae
Insects described in 1933
Diptera of South America